Saraz may refer to:

Places 
Saraz, Doubs, a commune in France
Săraz, a river in Timiș County, Romania
Saraz (river), a river in Bihor County, Romania
Saraz region, in Jammu and Kashmir, India

People 
Jenő Ábrahám, nicknamed Saraz, Hungarian–Yugoslav footballer
Rodrigo Saraz, Colombian footballer

See also
Sarazi, a language of India